Haitham Yousif (born Haitham Abed Yousif Sadiq,, November 29, 1969) is an Iraqi singer, composer and songwriter. He is referred as the Prince of Love in the Middle East.

Biography 
Haitham Yousif was born in Baghdad, Iraq on November 29, 1969 to Assyrian parents originally from the town of Alqosh.

His musical career started at a young age in 1983, in his participation in a band of Baghdad children. He had to overcome many obstacles and hardships as a young aspiring singer before achieving fame.

Yousif was initially featured on Mix tapes from Casablanca (an Iraqi music production company). His first song "Ma Asalhak" was viewed on Iraqi TV in 1989. His breakthrough single "Ya Nas" ("O people") in 1992, gave him success. His first album titled "Ya Nas" was released in 1993 with the song "Ya Nas" chosen in 1994 TV poll as the best Iraqi song of that year, That same year he was also chosen Iraqi singer of the year.

He went on to record 5 musical albums including love songs, nostalgic songs specially sung for Iraq and a sport song "Farahtona" dedicated to the Iraqi soccer team.

2000–present 

Yousif recorded 7 more successful musical albums and shot more than 40 music videos. Since the 2003 Iraq invasion, he has performed worldwide including Australia and Europe. In 2009 Yousif had a dispute with Lebanese singer Ayman Zabib after he performed some of his songs without the permission of Yousif, and used them in his album. In 2017 he released his single titled Hedi Hedi with a music video filmed in Turkey.

Personal life
Yousif is not married. He currently lives in Michigan, USA and runs a dentistry with Dr. Sundus Marogy. Football is one of his hobbies, and is a fan of the Al Zawra'a Football Club. He is a fan of The Beatles. In 2014, he launched his official YouTube channel. Yousif appeared in a show with presenter Ali Al Khalidy on Al Sharqiya TV channel in October 2021 after a 13-year media hiatus.

Discography 

 1993 – Ya Nas 
 1994 – Shefed Alnadam 
 1996 – Eshtagena 
 1997 – Layonha 
 1998 – Kadhaba 
 2000 – Ameer Al Hob (The Prince of Love) 
 2001 – Telepathy Love 
 2004 – Ahbab Al Roh  
 2006 – Asmar 
 2008 – Ashofak Helem 
 2012 – Ensaha 
 2014 – Awal Aloshaq

Singles

 2015 – Aya Nas
 2016 – Areed Wyah
 2016 – Shwya Hes
 2017 – Hedi Hedi
 2017 – Yarab Efrjha
 2017 – Khali Asfen
 2018 – Khadem
 2018 – Hobna Wena
 2019 – Ha yaba shqlna
 2019 – Iraqeen Abtaal
 2020 – Bik o Blyak
 2020 – Eni bsaati
 2020 – Ta3abna Hway 
 2020 – Mayhmni
 2021 – Hobak kadar
 2021 – Tfarqna
 2021 – Qosat Hobna featuring Mustafa Al Rubaiy

References 

1969 births
Living people
Musicians from Baghdad
20th-century Iraqi male singers
Iraqi composers
Iraqi Christians
Iraqi Assyrian people
21st-century Iraqi male singers